No. 119 Helicopter Unit (Stallions) is a Helicopter Unit and is equipped with Mil Mi-17 and based at Jamnagar Air Force Station.

History
The unit was raised on 3 March 1972 at Guwahati and has been operating the Mi-8 helicopters, the workhorse for the IAF. The unit was reequipped with Mil Mi-17 helicopters on 19 March 2014.

Assignments
The unit has been doing service in providing relief during natural calamities in Gujarat since it relocated at Jamnagar in 1990.

Aircraft
Mil Mi-17

References

119